Proline is an amino acid.
 Proline (data page)

Proline or Pro-Line may also refer to:

 Proline FC, football club in Uganda
 ProLine (company), an electronics brand
 Pro-Line Racing, a manufacturer of radio-controlled car accessories
 Sport Select, Canadian betting games also known as Pro-Line in some areas
 Proline, a line of prosumer camcorders manufactured by Panasonic
 ProLine, a software package with a Unix-like shell, used to run bulletin board systems on Apple II computers